Selenoneine is a selenium containing ergothioneine derivative where the selenium (Se) atom replaces a sulfur atom. It can be systematically named as (2-selenyl-Nα,Nα,Nα-trimethyl-L-histidine or 3-(2-hydroseleno-1H-imidazol-5-yl)-2-(trimethylammonio)propanoate).

It is found in the blood of bluefin tuna, and other sea dwelling animals like turtles, mackerel, beluga, and giant petrels. It is an antioxidant, combining with reactive oxygen species and boosting the action of GPx1.

Selenoneine is produced by microorganisms using enzymes that form a selenium-carbon bond. Humans that eat fish have selenoneine in their blood. About half of selenium is in the form of selenoneine. Selenoneine inhibits angiotensin-converting enzyme. In vertebrates, selenoneine is transported into cells using OCTN1. Selenoneine reacts with methyl mercury to form a mercury tetraselenoate complex, which degrades to tiemannite, a mercury selenide. This is a mechanism used to detoxify mercury in marine vertebrates. A related derivative, Se-methylselenoneine is found in lesser quantities in mackerel, sardine and tuna.

In air selenoneine is easily oxidised to a dimer containing a diselenide bond (Se-Se).

References

Selenols
Quaternary ammonium compounds
Imidazolines
Amino acids